Marmorofusus akitai is a species of sea snail, a marine gastropod mollusc in the family Fasciolariidae, the spindle snails, the tulip snails and their allies.

Description

Distribution
This marine species occurs off Japan.

References

 Habe T. (1961). Coloured illustrations of the shells of Japan (II). Hoikusha, Osaka. xii + 183 + 42 pp., 66 pls.
 Vermeij G.J. & Snyder M.A. (2018). Proposed genus-level classification of large species of Fusininae (Gastropoda, Fasciolariidae). Basteria. 82(4-6): 57-82

akitai
Gastropods described in 1961